Kolamuru is a locality in Rajamahendravaram City. It is a part of "Greater Rajamahendravaram Municipal Corporation (GRMC)".  It also forms a part of Godavari Urban Development Authority.

References

Villages in East Godavari district